Christopher Robert Winnes (born February 12, 1968) is an American retired professional ice hockey right winger who played parts of four seasons in the National Hockey League (NHL) with the Boston Bruins and Philadelphia Flyers between 1991 and 1993. The rest of his career, which lasted from 1991 to 2002, was spent in the minor leagues. Internationally Winnes played for the American national team at the 1992 World Championships. Winnes later became a firefighter with the Warwick Fire Department in Rhode Island.

Playing career
Recruited by a number of teams out of Northwood Prep School in Lake Placid, New York, Winnes was selected by the Boston Bruins in the 1987 Entry Draft (9th choice, 161st overall).

Winnes played four years (1987–1991) at the University of New Hampshire. During the 1987–88 season, he became the first freshman ever to lead his team in scoring, resulting in his nomination to the Hockey East All-Freshman Team.

At the conclusion of his senior year with the Wildcats in 1990–91, Winnes joined the Maine Mariners of the American Hockey League before making his NHL debut with the Bruins during the 1991 playoffs. He spent most of the 1991–92 season with the Mariners, but would go on to play 24 games with the Bruins that season and later competed at the 1992 World Championships as a member of the U.S. National team.

After playing in only five NHL games in 1992–93, and spending most of the season with the Providence Bruins, Winnes signed as a free agent with the Philadelphia Flyers in 1993. The following season saw Winnes play in four games with the Flyers, playing most of the season and the following in the minors as a member of the Hershey Bears.

Winnes retired from hockey following the 2001–02 season, ending a career which saw him play 34 NHL games, tallying one goal and six assists for seven points. Winnes' lone NHL goal occurred as a member of the Boston Bruins on November 22, 1991 in Boston's 6-3 loss to the Washington Capitals.

Career statistics

Regular season and playoffs

International

Awards and honors

References

External links
 

1968 births
Living people
American men's ice hockey right wingers
B.C. Icemen players
Boston Bruins draft picks
Boston Bruins players
Fort Wayne Komets players
Hartford Wolf Pack players
Hershey Bears players
Ice hockey players from Connecticut
Louisville Panthers players
Maine Mariners players
New Hampshire Wildcats men's ice hockey players
New Haven Knights players
People from Ridgefield, Connecticut
Philadelphia Flyers players
Providence Bruins players
Ridgewood High School (New Jersey) alumni
Springfield Falcons players
Utah Grizzlies (IHL) players